Kipper is a British animated children's television series based on the characters from Mick Inkpen's Kipper the Dog picture book series. Seventy-eight episodes were produced. Out of these, thirteen episodes - twelve of the first series, and the last of the third series, were written by Mick Inkpen himself. The videos have won awards including a BAFTA award for best children's animation. The show was released on VHS and DVD by HIT Entertainment.

Summary
The series follows Kipper the Dog as he goes on many fun and exciting adventures in a variety of places throughout the countryside with his friends, Tiger, Pig, Arnold, and Jake.

Episodes

Characters
 Kipper (voiced by Martin Clunes) is a fun-loving, caring, and warm-hearted dog with a soft voice who is the titular character of the series. He embodies the true essence of what it means to carpe diem. He is also very selfless, even though he hoards lots of small belongings like books and toys. Kipper is a beagle and Jack Russell terrier mix who has many exciting encounters with his friends.
 Tiger (voiced by Chris Lang) is Kipper's best friend. He is more realistic, practical, and wise than Kipper with a tendency to think long term. Sometimes Tiger can be very smug and haughty, even though he really is a kind dog at heart. Tiger is a Scottish terrier and Schnauzer mix.
 Pig (voiced by Chris Lang) is Kipper's second best friend. Pig likes to eat chocolate cakes and cookies.
 Arnold (voiced by Chris Lang) is Pig's toddler cousin who is more curious and observant than Pig. Arnold normally doesn't say anything, but at times he says easy words such as "duck", "kitten", and "igloo".
 Jake (voiced by Chris Lang) is a friendly and clumsy Old English sheepdog who is one of Kipper's best friends. He is a minor character in the first series and joins the main characters in the second series where he, Kipper, and Tiger have had many adventures together.
 Mr. Frog (voiced by Chris Lang) is a magic frog who runs into Kipper occasionally.
 The Bleeper People (voiced by Chris Lang) are two space aliens who live on the moon.
 Mouse (voiced by Julia Sawalha) is a young female mouse who lives with Kipper at his house. She speaks with an English accent and is a minor character.

Broadcast
The series aired on the Children's ITV (later CITV) block on ITV, Tiny Pop, and Nick Jr. in the United Kingdom and also on Nick Jr., CBS, and PBS Kids Sprout in the United States. It also aired in Canada on YTV around the late 1990s as a part of its YTV Jr. lineup.

Home media

UK releases
In the United Kingdom, HIT Video and HIT Entertainment PLC both released various VHS tapes and DVD releases of the television series.

US releases
In the United States, VHS tapes of the show were originally released by Hallmark Home Entertainment through Family Home Entertainment, Artisan Entertainment, and briefly Lyrick Studios, and later on, VHS tapes and DVDs were released by HIT themselves.

Digital download releases
This list is for videos that were never released on physical media and are only available on digital download in the US. There are currently only two. One is called "Tales of Adventure" featuring episodes already on other releases. The other is an alternate version of "The Visitor & Other Stories" in which the episodes are in reverse order as to how they are on the US VHS release.

Reception
Common Sense Media gives Kipper four out of five stars, and it says the show's characters are positive role models, except Tiger, "but he always learns his lessons"; all the characters "do lots of exploring and learn lessons about friendship, kindness, and the difference between right and wrong". A list published by the Thomas B. Fordham Institute names Kipper as the top television show for two- and three-year-old children because of its focus on "developing social and emotional intelligence" through interactions among its characters.

References

External links
 

1990s British animated television series
1990s British children's television series
1997 British television series debuts
2000 British television series endings
2000s British animated television series
2000s British children's television series
Children's television characters
British children's animated comedy television series
British educational television series
English-language television shows
ITV children's television shows
Animated television series about children
Animated television series about dogs
Animated television series about pigs
Television series by Mattel Creations
HIT Entertainment
British television shows based on children's books